Aethes baloghi is a species of moth of the family Tortricidae. It is found in the United States, where it has been recorded from New York, Illinois, Indiana, Massachusetts, Michigan, Mississippi, Missouri, New Jersey, New York, North Carolina and Virginia. The habitat consists of prairie.

The ground color of the forewings is cream suffused with buff and with orange-brown markings. The hindwings are dark drab. Adults are on wing from March to September, probably in multiple generations per year.

Etymology
The species is named in honor of George J. Balogh.

References

baloghi
Moths described in 2002
Moths of North America